Joseph van Vicker (born 1 August 1977), better known as Van Vicker, is a Ghanaian actor, movie director and humanitarian. He is the chief executive officer of Sky + Orange production, a film production house. Van Vicker received two nominations for "Best Actor in a Leading Role" and "Best Upcoming Actor" at the Africa Movie Academy Awards in 2008.

Early life
Vicker was born in Accra, Ghana on to a Ghanaian- Liberian mother and a Dutch father. His father died when he was six years old.

Vicker attended Mfantsipim School, along with fellow actor Majid Michel. He graduated from African University College of Communications in 2021.

Career

Television
Vicker started out in the entertainment world in radio as a presenter at Groove 106.3 fm (1999–2000) and Vibe 91.9fm (2001–2004) and as a television personality for TV3 Ghana (1997–1999) & Metro TV (2000–2004), Vicker appeared in the Ghanaian television series Sun city, which depicted university life. He played the character of LeRoy King Jr., a Fine Arts student born in the U.S. who arrives at Sun city to complete his education. The series ran for a total of 10 episodes.

Film
Soon, Vicker was cast in his first film Divine Love as a supporting character. This film coincidentally, was also the debut roles for fellow actors Jackie Appiah and Majid Michel who were cast in the female and male lead respectively.

Vicker is usually cast as the male romantic lead, often alongside actresses Jackie Appiah and Nadia Buari. He is often compared to fellow Ghanaian actor Majid Michel and Nigerian Ramsey Nouah.

Nollywood breakthrough
Vicker has appeared in numerous Nollywood films alongside prominent Nollywood actors, including Tonto Dikeh, Mercy Johnson, Stephanie Okereke,  Chika Ike and Jim Iyke. His Nollywood movies include; My Soul Mate, Heart of Fire, Popular King, Gambling with Marriage, Harvest of Love, Stolen Will, The Joy of a Prince, Discovered, The Kingdom and Against the law.

International success

Vicker has directed, starred in, and produced five films under his Sky + Orange Productions since 2008. 2012 was the biggest year for his production house, earning him the NAFCA Best Actor and Director Awards for his comedy movie, Joni Waka.

Vicker has been nominated for and won numerous awards from Africa to the Caribbean. Awards include Ghana Movie Awards, ACRAG awards and the Nollywood Academy Films Critics’ Awards. In 2009, he won the Best African Caribbean Actor and Best Actor African American and in 2011, he won the Pan African creative actor. In 2013, he won the Best International Actor award at the Papyrus Magazine Screen Actors Awards (PAMSAA) 2013, which was held in Abuja, Nigeria.

Awards and nominations

Filmography

References

External links
 
 

1977 births
Living people
Mfantsipim School alumni
Dutch male film actors
Liberian male film actors
Ghanaian male film actors
Ghanaian people of Liberian descent
Ghanaian people of Dutch descent
21st-century Ghanaian male actors
Ghanaian film actors